The Samsung Galaxy S III Mini (stylized as Samsung GALAXY S III mini, model number: GT-I8190) is a touchscreen-based, slate-sized smartphone designed and manufactured by Samsung. It was announced in October 2012 and released in November 2012. The Galaxy S III Mini technological specifications include a 4-inch Super AMOLED display, a dual-core processor running at 1 GHz with 1 GB of RAM, a 5-megapixel rear camera, and a front-facing VGA camera for video calls or selfies.

Samsung Galaxy S III Mini is a smaller version of the Samsung Galaxy S III and contains many of the same features. However, it lacks an 8-megapixel rear camera, bigger 4.8-inch screen and Gorilla Glass display. This device has a 42 h endurance rating. The device initially ran on Android 4.1 (Jelly Bean) but has now been updated to 4.1.2. Other features include Samsung's TouchWiz Skin, ChatON instant messaging, Smart alert, Buddy Photo Share, Pop-Up Play, S Suggest, S Voice, Smart Stay, Video Hub, Game Hub 2.0, and the S Beam technology (S Beam only available on special NFC edition, GT-I8190N). This device's battery varies from different carriers, and it will either have a 3-pin battery, which is widely used and sold, or a 4-pin battery.

Other variants
An alternative 'upgraded' Galaxy S III Mini version (SM-G730A) is available from the US carrier AT&T, which features a different processor (Qualcomm 1.2 GHz dual-core Snapdragon 400), NFC, 2000 mAh battery, and 4G LTE data speeds, among other differences. It retains the same 4-inch (800×480 pixels), Super AMOLED screen as the original 'international' Galaxy S III Mini. As of June 6, 2014, the AT&T website shows this version of the phone shipping with Android 4.4 KitKat installed.

In March 2014, another variant of this device (GT-I8200) was released in some countries, with the GT-I8200N model featuring NFC and the GT-I8200L model in Latin America. This variant features a different SoC (Marvell PXA986, dual-core) clocked at 1.2 GHz, with the Vivante GC1000 GPU, those specs were used in the Galaxy Tab 3 7.0 as well. The GT-I8200/N/L variants are shipped with Android 4.2.2 Jelly Bean out of the box, as opposed to the older GT-I8190 variant which was shipped with 4.1.1.

Successor

The successor to the Galaxy S III Mini is the Galaxy S4 Mini. It was announced on May 30, 2013, and was subsequently released in July 2013.

See also 
 Comparison of Samsung Galaxy S smartphones
 Samsung Galaxy S series

References

Android (operating system) devices
Galaxy S
Galaxy S
Mobile phones introduced in 2012
Discontinued smartphones
Mobile phones with user-replaceable battery